The World Figure Skating Championships is an annual figure skating competition sanctioned by the International Skating Union in which figure skaters compete for the title of World Champion.

Men's competitions took place from February 21 to 22 in Helsingfors (Helsinki), Finland. This was the first time that more than ten men participated in the competition. Ladies' competitions took place from January 24 to 25 in St. Moritz, Switzerland. Pairs' competition took place on January 25 also in St. Moritz, Switzerland. These were the last World Championships in figure skating before World War I.

Results

Men

 Referee: Wyacheslav Sresnewsky 

Judges:
 H. Bardy 
 Walter Jakobsson 
 I. (Nikolai) Kolomenkin 
 Otto Petterson 
 Jeno (Eugen) Minich

Ladies

Judges:
 Josef Fellner 
 Eduard Engelmann 
 Walter Jakobsson 
 Herbert Ramon Yglesias 
 Georg Helfrich

Pairs

Judges:
 Herbert Ramon Yglesias 
 E. S. Hirst 
 J. Keiller Greig 
 Georg Helfrich 
 James H. Johnson

Sources
 Result List provided by the ISU

World Figure Skating Championships
World Figure Skating Championships
World Figure Skating Championships 1914
World Figure Skating Championships 1914
International figure skating competitions hosted by Finland
International figure skating competitions hosted by Switzerland
World Figure Skating Championships
1900s in Helsinki
World Figure Skating Championships
World Figure Skating Championships
International sports competitions in Helsinki